Whitefish Bay is a large bay on the eastern end of Lake Superior between Michigan, United States, and Ontario, Canada. It is located between Whitefish Point in Michigan and Whiskey Point along the more rugged, largely wilderness Canadian Shield of Ontario. The international border runs through the bay, which is heavily used by shipping traffic northbound from and southbound to the Soo Locks.

The Whitefish Point Light marks the entry of the bay, Ile Parisienne Light is in the middle of the bay, and Gros Cap Reefs Light lies near the outlet of the bay and the approach to the Soo Locks at Sault Ste. Marie, Michigan.

Whitefish Point Lighthouse is the oldest active light on Lake Superior. Part of the lighthouse station houses the Great Lakes Shipwreck Museum.

After the Soo Locks opened in 1855 and ship traffic increased on Lake Superior, Whitefish Bay was the site of numerous shipwrecks, often due to hazardous weather. The Whitefish Point Underwater Preserve was established to preserve many of the shipwrecks of Whitefish Bay for future generations of sports divers.

Gallery

In Popular Culture

The Bay is mentioned in Gordon Lightfoot's song, The Wreck of the Edmund Fitzgerald.

See also
 Ile Parisienne
 Batchawana Bay - smaller sub-bay of Whitefish Bay
 Goulais Bay - smaller sub-bay of Whitefish Bay
 Point Iroquois Light
 Sandy Islands Provincial Park
 Shipwrecks of the 1913 Great Lakes storm
 Whitefish Bay National Forest Scenic Byway

References

External links

 Ile Parisienne Light photographs from Marinas.com
 Iroquois Light
 Great Lakes Shipwreck Museum
 Whitefish Point Underwater Preserve
 Whitefish Point Bird Observatory

Bays of Michigan
Bays of Ontario
Bodies of water of Chippewa County, Michigan
Landforms of Algoma District
Important Bird Areas of Ontario
Canada–United States border
Bays of Lake Superior